Two steamships of DDG Hansa were named Freienfels.

, seized in 1914 by the United Kingdom
, struck a mine off Livorno, Italy in 1941 and sank

Ship names